The Serbian Hockey League Season for 2000-2001 was the tenth season of the league. Unlike in the previous season, teams from Belgrade participated. However, the dominance established by HK Vojvodina in their absence was maintained, as the club won its fourth title in a row.

Teams
HK Vojvodina
HK Spartak Subotica
HK Novi Sad
HK Partizan
HK Taš

Regular season standings

Playoffs
In the finals HK Vojvodina beat HK Partizan.
Game 1 - HK Vojvodina vs HK Partizan 7-2
Game 2 - HK Vojvodina vs HK Partizan 11-3

Serbian Hockey League
Serbian Hockey League seasons
Serbian Hockey League